Liberty is an unincorporated community in Rowan County, North Carolina, United States.

References 

Unincorporated communities in Rowan County, North Carolina
Unincorporated communities in North Carolina